John Piper may refer to:
John Piper (artist) (1903–1992), English painter, printmaker and designer of stained-glass windows 
John Piper (author) (born 1953), English author and market analyst
John Piper (broadcaster), BBC radio host
John Piper (military officer) (1773–1851), lieutenant-governor of Norfolk Island
John Piper (theologian) (born 1946), Calvinist Baptist pastor and author